Carina Adolfsson Elgestam (born 1959) is a Swedish social democratic politician. She has been a member of the Riksdag from 1998 until her retirement in 2016.

External links
Carina Adolfsson Elgestam at the Riksdag website

1959 births
Living people
Members of the Riksdag from the Social Democrats
Women members of the Riksdag
Members of the Riksdag 1998–2002
Members of the Riksdag 2002–2006
Members of the Riksdag 2006–2010
Members of the Riksdag 2010–2014
21st-century Swedish women politicians
20th-century Swedish women politicians
20th-century Swedish politicians